Rettenmeyerius is a genus of mites in the family Ascidae.

Species
 Rettenmeyerius agnesae Elzinga, 1998      
 Rettenmeyerius carli Elzinga, 1998      
 Rettenmeyerius marianae Elzinga, 1998      
 Rettenmeyerius plaumanni Elzinga, 1998      
 Rettenmeyerius schneirlai Elzinga, 1998

References

Ascidae